Los Muertos Brewing is a brewery and restaurant in Puerto Vallarta, in the Mexican state of Jalisco.

Description and history
Conner Watts founded the business in 2012. The restaurant serves homemade pizza; the drink menu is focused on Los Muertos brews, but other beer options are available as well. In 2019, Jayme Lamm of Houstonia described Los Muertos as a "popular microbrewery offering casual dining with world-class pizza and plenty of craft beer options".

Lonely Planet describes Los Muertos as "an attractive brick-arched, concrete-floored pub and microbrewery that draws a lively mix of old-timers and visitors. The beer comes in seven varieties including a hoppy IPA called 'Revenge', a malty, dark 'Hop On!' that defies easy description, and a fine 'McSanchez' stout." Fodor's says: 

The business hosts an annual "Fiesta en la Calle" street party.

See also

 List of restaurants in Mexico

References

External links

 
 Los Muertos Brewing at BeerAdvocate

2012 establishments in Mexico
Beer in Mexico
Breweries
Restaurants in Jalisco
Zona Romántica